Philip Chidi Onyemah (born 20 February 1984) is a Nigerian professional footballer who plays for Portuguese club Ninense as a forward.

Club career
Born in Lagos, Onyemah moved to Portugal still in his early teens, beginning his career with amateurs Associação Desportiva Fornos de Algodres. In 2002 he signed with FC Porto, where he finished his formation.

In the 2003 summer, Onyemah joined F.C. Famalicão, appearing in two fourth division seasons with the team and impressing enough to earn a move straight into the Primeira Liga with Rio Ave FC. He played 33 games in his first year (four goals), with the Vila do Conde side eventually being relegated.

Onyemah scored another four goals in 2007–08 to help Rio Ave return to the top level. In November 2008 he was on trial with Romania's FC Timişoara, but nothing came of it.

Onyemah appeared regularly for Rio Ave in the following two seasons – 28 starts combined – helping the club consecutive maintain its league status whilst contributing with three goals combined. In early July 2010 he moved to Olympiakos Nicosia of Cyprus, freshly promoted to the First Division.

References

External links

1984 births
Living people
Sportspeople from Lagos
Nigerian footballers
Association football forwards
Primeira Liga players
Liga Portugal 2 players
Segunda Divisão players
F.C. Famalicão players
Rio Ave F.C. players
Cypriot First Division players
Cypriot Second Division players
Olympiakos Nicosia players
Ethnikos Achna FC players
Nea Salamis Famagusta FC players
Super League Greece players
Platanias F.C. players
Nigerian expatriate footballers
Expatriate footballers in Portugal
Expatriate footballers in Cyprus
Expatriate footballers in Greece
Nigerian expatriate sportspeople in Portugal
Nigerian expatriate sportspeople in Cyprus